Ronald W. Allen (born c. 1942) is an American businessman. He served as the president, chairman and chief executive officer of Delta Air Lines from 1987 to 1997, and as the chairman and chief executive officer of Aaron's, Inc. from 2012 to 2014.

Early life
Allen was born circa 1942. He graduated from the Georgia Institute of Technology in 1964.

Career
Allen served as the president, chairman and chief executive officer of Delta Air Lines from 1987 to 1997, and as the chairman and chief executive officer of Aaron's, Inc. from 2012 to 2014.

Allen has been a director of The Coca-Cola Company since 1991, Aircastle since 2006, and Forward Air Corporation since 2014. He was previously a director of Forward Air Corporation from 2011 to 2013.

Philanthropy
Allen formerly served on the board of trustees of Presbyterian College.

Allen is on the 2018-2019 board of trustees for Georgia Tech Foundation.

References

Living people
Georgia Tech alumni
American chairpersons of corporations
American chief executives
Directors of The Coca-Cola Company
Year of birth missing (living people)